This is a list of points scoring systems used to determine the outcome of the annual FIM Motorcycle Grand Prix World Championship and Constructors' Championship since 1949. The championship titles are awarded to the competitor and constructor who accumulate the most championship points over the course of the championship season.

Points scoring systems

Source:

See also
 List of Formula One World Championship points scoring systems
 List of American Championship car racing points scoring systems
 List of NASCAR points scoring systems

Sources

External links
 motogp.com Official Website

FIM World Championship
Grand Prix motorcycle racing